Sardarashen or Sardarkend is a village that is, de facto, in the Askeran Province of the breakaway Republic of Artsakh; de jure, it is in the Khojaly District of Azerbaijan, in the disputed region of Nagorno-Karabakh.

History 
The modern village was founded in the 1760s. During the Soviet period, the village was part of the Askeran District of the Nagorno-Karabakh Autonomous Oblast.

Historical heritage sites 
Historical heritage sites in and around the village include the cave of Chngl, the village of Norshen from between the 12th and 19th centuries, a 12th/13th-century khachkar, a cemetery from between the 17th and 19th centuries, the 18th-century St. George's Church, and a 19th/20th-century shrine.

Economy and culture 
The population is mainly engaged in agriculture and animal husbandry. As of 2015, the village has a municipal building, a house of culture, a secondary school, and a medical centre.

Demographics 
The village has an ethnic Armenian-majority population. It had 181 inhabitants in 2005, and 137 inhabitants in 2015.

References

External links 
 

Populated places in Askeran Province
Populated places in Khojaly District